Kaushal Kishore is an Indian politician currently serving as the Minister of State for Ministry of Housing and Urban Affairs, Government of India since 7 July 2021. He is representing Mohanlalganj constituency, Uttar Pradesh. He is the national president of Parakh Mahasangh and is the State President of the party's SC wing. He is a leader of the party and an activist for issues of social justice.

Early life 

He was born in Begariya village, Tehsil-Mohanlalganj, District-Lucknow, Uttar Pradesh into a schedule caste Pasi community  to Shri Kallu Prasad and Smt. Parvati Devi. His mother was a housewife and his father was a farmer. The small land holding was not sufficient for family subsistence.

Kishore had very limited opportunities and means. He was average in academics but was known for his honesty and inquisitive mind. He was believed to be a  brave person by his villagers. They used to say that no one could ever dare to confront him as he always stood for the truth and what was right.  His parents used to worry a lot, at times, when he used to get into others’ disputes, stand beside those students who were weak and speak up for those who were subjected to exploitation and discrimination. In order to drive him off from getting into any unwanted situations his parents used to say that he loved to invite quarrels and ruckus. On being asked he used to have no answer why he used to invite problems for himself and family. It is now that he explains it that it was his sense of justice which used to drive him to take on those who used to exploit the weak and poor. He used to even stop his father whenever he felt that he was not giving due respect to his mother. On being asked for what would he risk his life, he said that it used to be a very spontaneous reaction whenever he witnessed injustice happening.

Education 

After completing his intermediate studies at his native place, Kali Charan Inter college, Lucknow, Kishore took admission in under graduate course at C.R. Degree College but could not continue as he got involved in family illness, and labourers and cultivators' causes.

He could buy a bicycle only in class 12th, after getting his first scholarship in 1977.

Career

Kishore was MLA from Malihabad constituency in 2002. In 2002-2003 he also rose to be a minister of state in Mulayam Singh's government.

Positions held

 2002-2007: member, Uttar Pradesh Legislative Assembly
 2003-2004: Minister of State, Govt. of Uttar Pradesh
 May, 2014: elected to 16th Lok Sabha
 May, 2019: elected to 17th Lok Sabha
 1 September 2014 – present: member, Standing Committee on Home Affairs; member, Consultative Committee, Ministry of Labour and Employment

References

Living people
India MPs 2014–2019
People from Lucknow district
Lok Sabha members from Uttar Pradesh
1960 births
India MPs 2019–present